Route 556, or Highway 556, may refer to:

Canada
Alberta Highway 556
 Ontario Highway 556

United Kingdom
 A556 road

United States
 
 
 
 
 
 
 
 Texas: